Cilt or CILT can refer to:

Cilt, a Welsh kilt — see Kilt#Other Celtic nations
Chartered Institute of Logistics and Transport
CILT-FM, a music radio station in Canada